Where's Wally? (called Where's Waldo? in North America) is an animated television series production based on the Where's Wally? books by Martin Handford, animated by DIC Enterprises and The Waldo Film Company. The television series aired on CBS for one season. The program's opening song "Where's Wally?" was composed by Michael Tavera. The distribution rights to the show are currently held by Mattel Television.

Plot 
The show follows the adventures of Wally/Waldo and his dog Woof, who were already established stars of the Where's Wally? picture book series. The cartoon Where's Waldo? went beyond the books' original concept, giving the characters depth and giving reasons for their adventures.

Wally/Waldo and his dog Woof travel to distant lands, solving mysteries and lending a helping hand wherever they could. With the help of his magic walking stick, Wally/Waldo could travel through space and time or travel to far off magical lands. Often sent by Wizard Whitebeard to help solve a puzzle, or mysteries, Where's Waldo? was a 1/2 hour puzzle of clues and riddles. The evil Waldo lookalike Odlaw was the show's villain, constantly plotting to steal Waldo's magic stick. In each episode Odlaw would team up with the other villains from the far-off lands to help get the magic stick, while Waldo and Woof teamed up with other land's "good-guys" to help with their problems. Waldo stayed true to the books' premise by means of the "Waldo's Minutes", during which the screen froze for a full minute so the viewer at home could try to find Wally. This kind of segment aired twice per episode.

Characters
 Wally/Waldo (voiced by Townsend Coleman) - Wally is the star of the Where's Wally? series. The character is known for his distinct wardrobe of a red and white striped shirt, blue jeans, brown boots, red and white striped socks, glasses, and his red and white bobbled hat. He has traveled all over the world, through time, and to distant magical lands. Waldo is not the only one like him; he comes from the Land of Waldos, which is a land filled with Waldos just like him. Waldo is always ready for an adventure with his walking stick in hand, and trusty dog Woof by his side. His favorite hobbies are reading and collecting things from his many travels. The character's age is unknown and his height is described as "tallish" and weight as "lightish". Wally has a happy-go-lucky attitude and is often seen with a smile on his face. Waldo first appeared in 1987 in the book Where's Wally?. Over the years Wally's appearance changed only slightly.
 Woof (voiced by David Workman) - Woof is Wally's dog and good friend. Woof originally belonged to Wilma, but over the years became Waldo's dog. Woof comes from the Land of Woofs, which is a land full of dogs like him. Like his owner, Woof sports a red and white bobbled hat, glasses, and a red and white striped suit. Woof sets off with Waldo on his travels with his bone, but always seems to lose it. Woof is shy and easily scared. He gets so scared at many of the places he travels to that he hides, leaving only his tail showing. In the classic Waldo books, only Woof's tail can be spotted.  Woof first appeared in 1990 in Where's Waldo: The Ultimate Fun Book.
 Wizard Whitebeard (voiced by Brad Garrett impersonating Rodney Dangerfield) - the magical Wizard Whitebeard often visits Waldo with one of his many magical scrolls (something he always ends up losing). The Wizard is recognizable by his red robe, blue hat, long white beard, and his striped staff. Whitebeard is the one with the magic that allows Waldo and his friends to travel to all the magical and far off lands. While there are rumors stating that he is the father of Wenda, these have not been confirmed and are not considered canon. Wizard Whitebeard first appeared in 1989 in the book Where's Waldo?: The Fantastic Journey.
 Odlaw (voiced by Julian Holloway) - Odlaw is the villain of the Where's Waldo? series. He is "mean, nasty, loathsome and disgusting". His number of good deeds are few and all he cares about is getting his hands on Waldo's magic walking stick. His wardrobe includes a black and yellow striped shirt, black jeans, boots, dark glasses, yellow and black bobbled hat, and a slick moustache. Odlaw seems to be something of an evil twin to Waldo, and it is later confirmed by the revelation that he comes from Odlaw's Swamp, where hundreds of other Odlaws live, which is a parallel to the Land of Waldos. Odlaw can be really clumsy, so he always ends up getting hurt. Odlaw's name comes from "Waldo" spelled backwards. He first appeared in 1991 in the book Where's Wally: The Magnificent Poster Book! where his role was like an "Anti-Waldo".
 Wenda: Wenda is Waldo's best friend. The character is the "one who takes the pictures" according to the intro of The Wonder Book, but she always loses her camera. Wenda was featured in the Where's Waldo? television series, in the episode "The Living Exhibits". She first appeared in 1991 in Where's Waldo: The Magnificent Poster Book along with her twin sister, Wilma. Wilma, however, has not been seen since. Wenda's wardrobes include a red and white striped shirt, blue skirt, red and white striped stockings, glasses, and red and white bobbled hat.

The series was narrated by Jim Cummings.

International changes
To meet the needs of international viewers in the United States and Canada, a second audio track was recorded using the same vocal actors – the name "Wally" was replaced entirely with "Waldo", the name of the books' character in the United States and Canada.  Other international versions were produced dubbed in entirely in German, French, Spanish, Italian, Japanese and other languages (many times with Wally's name being changed to match that country's name from the original books).

Episodes

Home media

DVD release
The animated show was released in Australia on the May 7, 2009 with Where's Wally? Vol. 1 – My Left Fang. As of February 2013, Mattel Television has yet to announce any plans for a US DVD release of the show. However, episodes were previously released on videocassette in the 1990s by Twentieth Century Fox Home Entertainment, Fox Kids Video and CBS Video.

UK VHS releases
 Abbey Home Entertainment (Tempo Video) (1992–1994)

Awards
The Where's Wally? cartoon was nominated for the "1992 annual Young Artist Award" for Outstanding New Animation Series but lost the award to Back to the Future: The Animated Series (also on CBS). The show lasted only one season on CBS airing 13 episodes between September 14 and December 14, 1991, before being cancelled because of low ratings (as a result of direct competition from NBC's juggernaut Saved by the Bell and ABC's The Bugs Bunny and Tweety Show). Reruns of the episodes aired on CBS until September 5, 1992.

Merchandise
In 1992, Little, Brown and Company released two Waldo books based on the adventures and characters from the Where's Waldo? TV Show. Fun with Waldo and More Fun with Waldo, featured print versions of many of the "Waldo Minute" freeze-frame scenes, along with new puzzles and things to spot in each picture.

Voices
 Townsend Coleman - Wally (Waldo in U.S. and Canada)
 Jim Cummings - Narrator
 Brad Garrett - Wizard Whitebeard
 Julian Holloway - Odlaw
 Dave Workman - Woof

Additional voices

 Joe Alaskey
 Jack Angel
 Jeff Bennett
 Gregg Berger
 Susan Blu
 Carol Channing
 Cam Clarke
 Brian Cummings
 Jennifer Darling
 Jeannie Elias
 Pat Fraley
 Maurice LaMarche
 Mary McDonald Lewis
 Michelle Mariana
 John Mariano
 Chuck McCann
 Pat Musick
 Alan Oppenheimer
 Rob Paulsen
 Jan Rabson
 Roger Rose
 Susan Silo
 Frank Welker

Reboot series
In 2019, a reboot entitled Where's Waldo? (produced by DreamWorks Animation Television) was premiered on Universal Kids on July 20.

References

External links
 

CBS original programming
1990s American animated television series
1991 American television series debuts
1991 American television series endings
1990s Canadian animated television series
1991 Canadian television series debuts
1991 Canadian television series endings
1990s British animated television series
1991 British television series debuts
1991 British television series endings
English-language television shows
American television shows based on children's books
Canadian television shows based on children's books
British television shows based on children's books
Television series by DHX Media
Television series by DIC Entertainment
Television series by Mattel Creations
Television series by Sony Pictures Television
Where's Wally?
American children's animated adventure television series
American children's animated comedy television series
Canadian children's animated adventure television series
Canadian children's animated comedy television series
British children's animated adventure television series
British children's animated comedy television series